Tin Man is a 1983 American drama film directed by John G. Thomas and starring Timothy Bottoms, John Phillip Law, Deana Jurgens, Troy Donahue, and Richard Stahl.

Premise
A deaf auto mechanic invents a computer so he can hear and speak.  When he attempts to patent his invention he is taken advantage of by a self-serving salesman.

Cast

Main
 Timothy Bottoms as Casey
 Deana Jurgens as Marcia
 John Phillip Law as Dr. Edison
 Troy Donahue as Lester
 Richard Stahl as Tyson

Supporting
 Gerry Black as Maddox
 Brian Avery as Forbes
 Hank Underwood as Big Bob
 Michael W. Green as Slim
 Lori Hennessey as Cynthia
 L. Burton Williams as Johnson
 Walter G. Zeri as Wesson (Credited as Walter Zeni)
 Aaron Biston as Pizza #1
 Jay Elher as Pizza #2
 Rae Maguire as Nurse
 Jane Finstrom as Taco Bell Girl #1
 Laurette Healy as Taco Bell Girl #2
 Don Phillips as Policeman
 Will MacMillan as Artie

See also

List of films featuring the deaf and hard of hearing

References

External links

1983 films
1983 drama films
American drama films
1980s English-language films
1980s American films